KRI Fatahillah (361) is an Indonesian Navy ship named after Fatahillah, a national war heroic figure who recaptured Sunda Kelapa from the Portuguese and consequently changed its name to Jayakarta.

Design
Fatahillah has a complement of 89 personnel, including 11 officers.

Mid-Life upgrade
Ultra Electronics (Ultra CCS) was awarded a contract as the prime contractor for the mid-life upgrade of KRI Fatahillah in 2013 which includes replacement of the Combat Management System and sensors, re-powering and general overhaul, this USD50M contract is due to complete with ship handover back to the Navy in 2016. This upgrade included replacement of the WM-25 fire control radar with the installation of SCANTER 4100 and the installation of the Ultra Electronics Command and Control system. Tellumat Defence & Security also provided the PT-2500 naval IFF system to Ultra Electronics for the mid-life upgrade.

In December 2016, PT. Dok dan Perkapalan Surabaya hand over the completed ship to Indonesian Ministry of Defense at their yard in Surabaya.

Service history
Fatahillah was laid down on 31 January 1977 at Wilton-Fijenoord, Schiedam, Netherlands. The ship was launched on 22 December 1977 and was commissioned on 16 July 1979.

The ship was part of a team of several Indonesian and one US Navy vessels searching for the missing Adam Air Flight 574. It located several unidentified metal objects which may have been part of the missing plane.

References

 
 
 
 Jackson. Grange books. Destroyer, frigate, corvette. 2000

External links

 KRI Fatahillah on TNI-AL's (Indonesian Navy) website

Fatahillah-class corvettes
Ships built by Wilton-Fijenoord
1977 ships
Corvettes of the Cold War